(5 May 1924 – 1 November 2014) was a Japanese politician. He held different cabinet posts and served as the speaker of the House of Representatives.

Early life and education
Tamura was born in Matsuzaka, Mie Prefecture, in 1924. In 1950, he received a law degree from Keio University.

Career and activities
Tamura was a member of the Liberal Democratic Party. He was first elected to the House of Representatives in 1955. In the party Tamura was one of the leaders of the Interparty Relations Committee and belonged to the faction led by Kakuei Tanaka.

He was appointed labour minister in 1972 and transport minister in 1976. As of 1975 he was the chairman of the Committee of Korean Affairs of the Afro-Asian Problems Study
Group. In July that year Tamura headed a delegation which visited North Korea and met with Korean ruler Kim Il-sung in Pyongyang. Tamura served as minister of international trade and industry from 1986 to 1988 in the cabinets led by Prime Minister Yasuhiro Nakasone and then by Noboru Takeshita. When he was in office he apologized to the United States for an export violation committed by a Japanese manufacturer. In a reshuffle in December 1988 Hiroshi Mitsuzuka replaced Tamura as minister of international trade and industry. Tamura became the speaker of the House of Representatives on 2 June 1989, replacing Kenzaburo Hara in the post. Tamura's term ended on 24 January 1990 when Yoshio Sakurauchi was appointed speaker.

Tamura, nicknamed the “wheeler-dealer” in political arena, retired from politics in 1996.

Personal life and death
Tamura was married and has three daughters. His nephew, Norihisa Tamura, served as the minister of health, labour, and welfare under Prime Minister Yoshihide Suga. Tamura died of natural causes on 1 November 2014 at age 90.

References

External links

|-

|-

|-

|-

|-

|-

|-

20th-century Japanese politicians
1924 births
2014 deaths
Government ministers of Japan
Keio University alumni
Members of the House of Representatives (Japan)
People from Matsusaka, Mie
Speakers of the House of Representatives (Japan)
Liberal Democratic Party (Japan) politicians